A graveyard is a cemetery that is attached to a church. 

Graveyard may also refer to:

Sports
Eugene E. Stone III Stadium (Columbia, South Carolina), home football pitch of the South Carolina Gamecocks
Olympic Park Stadium (Melbourne) used by the Melbourne Storm rugby league club

Music
Graveyard (band), a Swedish rock/metal band
Graveyard (album), a 2007 album by Graveyard
The Graveyard (album), a 1996 album by King Diamond
"Graveyard (song)", a 2019 song by Halsey from the album Manic

Others
The Graveyard (film), 2006 low-budget horror film
The Graveyard (video game), a 2008 Belgian videogame
Graveyard (game), a game most commonly played by children on the playground, or at parties
Graveyard poets, or Graveyard School, 18th-century English poets
Graveyard Peak, a mountain in California

See also

 (includes many titles of form "The xxx Graveyard" or "xxx graveyard")